Redikor is a rural locality (a selo) in Cherdynsky District, Perm Krai, Russia. The population was 201 as of 2010. There are 3 streets.

Geography 
Redikor is located 31 km south of Cherdyn (the district's administrative centre) by road. Bolshaya Anikovskaya is the nearest rural locality.

References 

Rural localities in Cherdynsky District